Harpalus agakhaniantzi is a species of ground beetle in the subfamily Harpalinae. It was described by Mikhailov in 1972.

References

agakhaniantzi
Beetles described in 1972